The 2017–18 Alaska Anchorage Seawolves men's ice hockey season was the 39th season of play for the program, the 36th at the Division I level and the 25th in the WCHA conference. The Seawolves represented the University of Alaska Anchorage and were coached by Matt Thomas, in his 5th season.

Season
Alaska Anchorage entered the season trying to pull out of the tailspin that had begun after Matt Thomas' surprising first season. The team started well, pushing North Dakota into overtime twice, but couldn't get their offense on track over the next few weeks. After finally getting their first win over Lake Superior State, the Seawolves ran off three consecutive wins in mid-November and looked like they may have found a recipe for success.

Unfortunately, as soon as December rolled around, the offense dried up and Alaska Anchorage lost 19 of their next 20 games. During the run, senior netminder Olivier Mantha did what he could to keep the Seawolves within striking distance, be he was called upon to stop more than 40 shots on multiple occasions. While Brody Claeys got some starts in towards the end of the season, Mantha was in net for the season finale against Alaska and finally got some support when the Seawolves scored a season-high 5 goals. Mantha ended the season as well as his college career on a high note with a second win, salvaging an otherwise terrible season.

Departures

Recruiting

Roster

Standings

Schedule and results

|-
!colspan=12 style=";" | Exhibition

|-
!colspan=12 style=";" | Regular Season

Scoring statistics

Goaltending statistics

Rankings

USCHO did not release a poll in Week 24.

Awards and honors

References

Alaska Anchorage Seawolves men's ice hockey seasons
Alaska Anchorage Seawolves
Alaska Anchorage Seawolves
2017 in sports in Alaska
2018 in sports in Alaska